Božo Bakota (5 October 1950 – 1 October 2015) was a Croatian footballer who throughout his entire professional football career played only for two football clubs, NK Zagreb and SK Sturm Graz. He played as a midfielder for NK Zagreb and as a forward for SK Sturm Graz during a career spanning from 1971 to 1986.

Club career

NK Zagreb

Bakota started his career with NK Zagreb and played there for the first nine seasons of his career, at a time when the club was struggling to establish themselves as a stable top flight side. At the beginning of his career, he participated in one of the most notable matches NK Zagreb ever played. It was a second leg of qualifying match between NK Zagreb and NK Osijek for entering the first league. The first one in Osijek ended 0–0. Match, known as "Great drama in Maksimir", took place on 19 July 1973 at Maksimir stadium because of great demand for tickets. The attendance was 64.138 which broke the stadium record and stands to this day. He came in the game later on as a substitute for another notable NK Zagreb player, Željko Smolek. NK Zagreb eventually won the match, after a penalty shoot-out (4–3) which allowed them to play in season 1973–74 with the best clubs in top division. He stayed with the club after they were relegated from first division at the end of the 1973–74 season, and helped them return to top division the following years. In season 1974–75, which was the best season from Bakota in Zagreb jersey as he scored 11 goals in 34 appearances NK Zagreb finished second in Group West of Yugoslav Second League behind Borac from Banja Luka with no promotion to top division. Next season, NK Zagreb finally achieved promotion to first division by winning the Group West of Yugoslav Second League. Bakota scored 6 goals in 17 appearances. His second best season with NK Zagreb was 1977–78 when he scored 10 goals in 28 appearances, playing as their starting line-up midfielder. However, in 1979 they were relegated again.

Sturm Graz
After staying at the club for one more season, Bakota decided to re-join his former manager Otto Barić at Austrian side SK Sturm Graz in 1980. He flourished there, forming an attacking partnership with Gernot Jurtin, and helping the club finish as league runners-up in the 1980–81 season, as well as becoming the league's top scorer in the 1981–82 season with 24 goals in 36 appearances. In European competitions, his greatest achievement was reaching the 1983–84 UEFA Cup quarter-finals with Sturm, before they were knocked out by England's Nottingham Forest 1–2 on aggregate. Bakota retired in 1986, having scored a total of 86 goals in 167 Austrian Bundesliga appearances for Sturm.

His retirement was short lived as he played at the regional levels with FC Fürstenfeld, and SV Wildon. In 1988, he played abroad in the National Soccer League with Toronto Croatia.

International career
His good games at NK Zagreb were also noticed by the national team manager Dražan Jerković who called him up to the national side in 1978. Bakota debuted and earned his single national cap on 15 November 1978, in a Balkan Cup 4–1 win against Greece held in Skopje (in a match which saw Vahid Halilhodžić scoring a hat-trick).

Personal life

Bakota from Graz to Buzin
There are many sad stories in football. Božo Bakota, a former footballer of NK Zagreb, left a very deep mark in the Sturm Graz. He was a popular football player in that part of Austria. In the center of Graz he held a hugely popular Cafe "7". He owned gas stations, but the troubles clung to them. He lived in Buzin, a village near Zagreb, where he originated. He died on 1 October 2015.

References

External links
 
 Božo Bakota at the Serbia national football team website 

1950 births
2015 deaths
Footballers from Zagreb
Association football forwards
Yugoslav footballers
Yugoslavia international footballers
Croatian footballers
NK Zagreb players
SK Sturm Graz players
Toronto Croatia players
Yugoslav Second League players
Yugoslav First League players
Austrian Football Bundesliga players
Canadian National Soccer League players
Yugoslav expatriate footballers
Expatriate footballers in Austria
Yugoslav expatriate sportspeople in Austria
Expatriate soccer players in Canada
Yugoslav expatriate sportspeople in Canada